Kriss might refer to:

People
Kriss (surname)

Institute
 Korea Research Institute of Standards and Science

Miscellaneous
Kriss Kross, a type of fill-in puzzle
Kriss Super V, the action of the TDI Vector submachine gun.
Kris, an asymmetrical dagger in South East Asia. Both a weapon and spiritual object.
Krrish, an Indian movie from 2006.